Regen Projects is a contemporary art gallery in Los Angeles, California.

History 
Regen Projects was founded in 1989 by Stuart Regen and Shaun Caley Regen at 619 North Almont Drive in West Hollywood, California.

Artist Matthew Barney had his first solo gallery show at Regen Projects in 1991. The gallery was also the first to represent photographer Catherine Opie.

Stuart Regen died in 1998 from non-Hodgkin lymphoma.

In 2003, Regen Projects expanded to 633 North Almont Drive, and then in 2007, added another  space at 9016 Santa Monica Boulevard, designed by architect Michael Maltzan.

In 2012, the gallery opened a new space in Hollywood at the corner of Santa Monica Boulevard and Highland Avenue, again designed by Maltzan.

Artists 
Regen Projects currently represents the following artists:

 Doug Aitken
 Kader Attia
 Matthew Barney
 Kevin Beasley (since 2021)
 Walead Beshty
 John Bock
 Abraham Cruzvillegas
 Lizzie Fitch
 Theaster Gates
 Rachel Harrison
 Alex Hubbard
 Elliott Hundley
 Anish Kapoor
 Toba Khedoori
 Liz Larner
 Glenn Ligon
 Marilyn Minter
 Catherine Opie
 Silke Otto-Knapp
 Raymond Pettibon
 Elizabeth Peyton
 Jack Pierson
 Lari Pittman
 Richard Prince
 Daniel Richter
 Christina Quarles (since 2018)
 Willem de Rooij
 Wolfgang Tillmans
 Ryan Trecartin
 Gillian Wearing
 James Welling
 Sue Williams
 Andrea Zittel

In addition to living artists, Regen Projects also handles the estates of the following: 
 Dan Graham
 Lawrence Weiner

References

External links 
 
 Coverage of Regen Projects at Artforum
 Coverage of Regen Projects at ARTnews

Contemporary art galleries in the United States
Art museums and galleries in Los Angeles
Art museums and galleries in California
Art galleries established in 1989